Aulonocara brevirostre is a species of haplochromine cichlid which is endemic to Lake Malawi. It is found along the eastern shore of the Lake in Malawi, Mozambique and Tanzania.

Sources

Fish of Malawi
brevirostre
Taxa named by Ethelwynn Trewavas
Fish described in 1935
Taxonomy articles created by Polbot
Taxobox binomials not recognized by IUCN
Fish of Lake Malawi